Little is an unincorporated community in Breathitt County, Kentucky, United States. Its post office closed in 1995.

The community has the name of the local Little family.

References

Unincorporated communities in Breathitt County, Kentucky
Unincorporated communities in Kentucky